Robert Gravel (14 September 1944 – 12 August 1996) was an actor, dramatist, theatrical director and teacher.

Career
Gravel was born in Montreal.  He was an influential figure in the modern history of theatre in Quebec. In the middle of the 1970s, Gravel, Jean-Pierre Ronfard and Pol Pelletier co-founded the Théâtre Expérimental de Montréal (TEM). Later ideological conflicts led to the foundation of the Nouveau Théâtre Expérimental.

In 1977, Gravel co-founded with Yvon Leduc the highly successful Ligue Nationale d'Improvisation. He died in  Saint-Gabriel-de-Brandon in 1996 and was entombed at the Notre Dame des Neiges Cemetery in Montreal.

References
 Raymond Plante, Robert Gravel, sur les pistes du cheval indompté, Éditions les 400 coups, 2004.
Club-Culture report after Gravel's death

External links

1944 births
1996 deaths
French Quebecers
Canadian theatre directors
20th-century Canadian dramatists and playwrights
Canadian male stage actors
Male actors from Montreal
Writers from Montreal
Canadian dramatists and playwrights in French
20th-century Canadian male actors
Canadian male dramatists and playwrights
20th-century Canadian male writers
Burials at Notre Dame des Neiges Cemetery